National Route 155 is a national highway of Japan connecting Tokoname, Aichi and Yatomi, Aichi in Japan, with a total length of . It serves as Nagoya's outer loop.

History
Route 155 was originally designated on 18 May 1953 from Nagoya to Toyama. This was redesignated as Route 41 in 1959. The current routing of Route 155 dates from 1963.

See also

References

155
Ring roads in Japan
Roads in Aichi Prefecture